Amy Yang, also known as Yang Hee-Young (born 28 July 1989) is a South Korean professional golfer, currently playing on the United States-based LPGA Tour and on the Ladies European Tour (LET).

Amateur career
Yang began playing golf at age 10 in South Korea and moved to the Gold Coast of Australia with her family at age 15 to pursue golf more seriously.

In 2005, she won the Queensland Amateur Championship, the youngest winner ever of that championship. In 2006, while still an amateur she won the ANZ Ladies Masters on the Ladies European Tour (LET), making her the youngest winner ever on the LET at age  (a record later broken by 14-year-old amateur Atthaya Thitikul in July 2017).

Professional career
After her win in at the ANZ Ladies Masters, the LET offered Yang a special three-year membership exemption beginning in 2006 as a 17-year-old, providing she traveled with her parents until she turned 18. She recorded four top-20 finishes in 2007 while still attended high school.

Yang attended LPGA Tour qualifying school in the fall of 2007 and obtained conditional status on the LPGA Tour as well for 2008.

In June 2008, Yang claimed her second LET win with a four-shot win at the Ladies German Open. Upon winning, Yang announced that she was donating her entire  prize of $61,260 to victims of a recent earthquake in China.

That December, she returned to the LPGA Qualifying School, this time earning full playing status for 2009 by finishing second in the five-round event.

On 20 October 2013, Yang won her first LPGA Tour event at the LPGA KEB-HanaBank Championship. She birdied the first sudden-death playoff hole to defeat Hee-Kyung Seo.

On 1 March 2015, Yang won her second LPGA Tour championship at the Honda LPGA Thailand.

Personal life
Yang lives with her father, Joon Mo (James), mother, Sun Hee (Sunny), and younger brother, Steven. In the fall of 2007 the family moved from Australia to Orlando, Florida.

Professional wins (8)

LPGA Tour wins (4)

LPGA Tour playoff record (1–1)

Ladies European Tour (3)
2006 (1) ANZ Ladies Masters (as an amateur)
2008 (2) Ladies German Open, Scandinavian TPC hosted by Annika

KLPGA Tour (2)
2011 (1) KB Star Championship
2013 (1) LPGA KEB-HanaBank Championship (co-sanctioned by LPGA Tour)

Results in LPGA majors
Results not in chronological order before 2019.

^ The Evian Championship was added as a major in 2013.

LA = Low amateur
CUT = missed the half-way cut
NT = no tournament
"T" = tied

Summary

Most consecutive cuts made – 15 (2014 Evian – 2017 Evian)
Longest streak of top-10s – 3 (twice)

LPGA Tour career summary

official as of the 2022 season

Team appearances
Professional
International Crown (representing South Korea): 2016

References

External links

Seoul Sisters Profile
Amy Yang Pictures

South Korean female golfers
Ladies European Tour golfers
LPGA Tour golfers
Olympic golfers of South Korea
Golfers at the 2016 Summer Olympics
Sportspeople from Gyeonggi Province
Golfers from Orlando, Florida
1989 births
Living people
People from Goyang